Yasmeen-Marie Vella (born 10 February 1991) is a Maltese footballer who plays as a midfielder for Women's League club Birkirkara FC. She has been a member of the Malta women's national team.

References

1991 births
Living people
Women's association football midfielders
Maltese women's footballers
Malta women's international footballers